Sport Club Maguary, commonly known as Maguary, is a Brazilian football club based in Fortaleza, Ceará state.

The club was founded in January 2009,

Their stadium has a maximum capacity of 3,000 people.

References

Association football clubs established in 2009
Football clubs in Ceará
2009 establishments in Brazil